Harker Creek may refer to:

Harker Creek (Utah)
Harker Creek (Wisconsin)